Michael 'Mike' Graham Tredgett (born 1949) is a former English badminton player who specialized in doubles and played at the world level for more than a decade, winning numerous international men's doubles and mixed doubles titles.

Badminton career
Tredgett won five medals in the World Championships between 1977 and 1983. He is also one of the most successful players ever in the European Badminton Championships with 5 titles, three of them in men's doubles and two in mixed doubles. He shared three All-England mixed doubles titles (1978, 1980, 1981) with Nora Perry and reached the All-England men's doubles final twice with Ray Stevens (1972, 1980) and twice with Martin Dew (1983, 1984). He won men's doubles with Stevens at the 1978 Commonwealth Games.

In 1978 he married fellow badminton player Kathryn Whiting (a former English Junior champion).

Achievements

World Championships 
Men's doubles

IBF World Grand Prix 
The World Badminton Grand Prix sanctioned by International Badminton Federation (IBF) from 1983 to 2006.

Men's doubles

References

 All England champions 1899-2007
 English statistics
 Pat Davis: The Encyclopaedia of Badminton. Robert Hale, London, 1987, p. 169,

External links
 
 

1949 births
Living people
English male badminton players
Members of the Order of the British Empire
Commonwealth Games medallists in badminton
Commonwealth Games gold medallists for England
Badminton players at the 1978 Commonwealth Games
World Games medalists in badminton
World Games silver medalists
Competitors at the 1981 World Games
Medallists at the 1974 British Commonwealth Games
Medallists at the 1978 Commonwealth Games